The common name myrobalan can refer to several unrelated fruit-bearing plant species:

 Myrobalan plum (Prunus cerasifera), also called cherry plum and myrobalan plum
 Emblic myrobalan (Phyllanthus emblica), also called Amla and Amalaki
In the genus Terminalia:
 Beleric Myrobalan (Terminalia bellirica), also called Bibhitaki and Belliric myrobalans
 Black Myrobalan (Terminalia chebula), also called Haritaki and Chebulic myrobalans.

See also
 Mirabelle
 Triphala